The following is a summary of Tipperary county football team's 2020 season. David Power was in his first year as manager. The season was suspended in March 2020 due to the COVID-19 pandemic. The season resumed in mid-October of the same year.

On 22 November 2020, Tipperary won the Munster Senior Football Championship after a 0–17 to 0–14 win against Cork in the final. It was Tipperary's first Munster SFC title in 85 years.

To mark the centenary of Bloody Sunday, Tipperary wore special commemorative jerseys in white and green in the final, a replica of the colours worn by the Tipperary team which played Dublin at Croke Park in 1920.

Tipperary went on to play Mayo in the All-Ireland Semi-final on 6 December.
In foggy conditions they lost the game by 5–20 to 3-13 after being behind by 4–12 to 1–5 at half-time.

Competitions

National Football League

Munster Senior Football Championship

All-Ireland Senior Football Championship

Awards
In January 2021, Kevin Fahey, Bill Maher, Colin O’Riordan and Conor Sweeney were nominated for an All-Star award.

On 19 February 2021, Conor Sweeney was named at full-forward on the All-Star team for 2020, becoming the third ever Tipperary player to win an All-Star award.

Notes

References

Tipperary
Tipperary county football team seasons